Ashes to Ashes is a British fantasy crime drama and police procedural drama television series, serving as the sequel to Life on Mars.

The series began airing on BBC One in February 2008. A second series began broadcasting in April 2009. A third and final series was broadcast from 2 April to 21 May 2010 on BBC One and BBC HD.

Plot 

The series tells the story of Alex Drake (Keeley Hawes), a police officer in service with the London Metropolitan Police, who is shot in 2008 by a man named Arthur Layton and inexplicably regains consciousness in 1981.

The first episode of the series reveals that, in the present day, Drake has been studying records of the events seen in the series Life on Mars through reports made by Sam Tyler (John Simm) after he regained consciousness in the present. Upon waking in the past she is surprised to meet the returning characters of Gene Hunt (Philip Glenister), Ray Carling (Dean Andrews) and Chris Skelton (Marshall Lancaster), all of whom she has learnt about from her research, the trio having transferred from the Manchester setting of Life on Mars (Manchester and Salford Police) to London.

Tension between Drake and Hunt is built through the unsatisfactory explanation of Sam Tyler's absence and the perceived underhandedness and shoddy work of Hunt in contrast to the methodical, ethical and modern Drake. Continuing the theme of Life on Mars, throughout the series, it is ambiguous to both Drake and the audience whether the character is dead or alive in the present day and to what extent her actions influence future events.

Ending 

The final episode reveals that the Life on Mars/Ashes to Ashes world is a form of limbo or purgatory, for "restless dead" police officers. These restless dead include Drake, Sam Tyler and the main characters Gene, Ray, Chris, and Shaz (Montserrat Lombard), all of whom died in violent circumstances.

The revelation of their deaths comes as a surprise to all except Gene, who knew they were all dead but who had forgotten the circumstances of his own death, due to the passage of time. All except Hunt "move on" as he is a psychopomp (a spirit guide), an Archangel Michael-like figure, to all of his officers, helping them on their way to The Railway Arms pub (standing for heaven).

During the final series, the character of DCI Jim Keats was introduced, originally appearing to be assessing the capabilities of Gene's division. However, in reality, Keats was the devil who was attempting to bring down Gene and his world, dragging Hunt's colleagues down to 'his department' (hell). When he is finally defeated, Keats slinks into the night, laughing insanely and singing to Gene "We'll meet again, don't know where, don't know when." 

Finally Gene returns to his office, where a newly dead officer arrives, demanding his iPhone (implying that he is from the present) and asking where his office has gone, in a very similar manner to the arrival of Sam Tyler in the first episode of Life on Mars.  In fact, Gene's last words — "A word in your shell-like, pal" — are the same as his first words to Sam Tyler in the first episode of Life on Mars.

Cast

 Philip Glenister as Gene Hunt
 Keeley Hawes as Alex Drake
 Dean Andrews as Ray Carling
 Marshall Lancaster as Chris Skelton
 Montserrat Lombard as Shaz Granger
 Adrian Dunbar as Martin Summers (series 2)
 Daniel Mays as Jim Keats (series 3)

Production
Throughout the first series, Ashes to Ashes was broadcast weekly on Thursdays on BBC One at 9:00 pm, with the episodes directed by Jonny Campbell, Bille Eltringham and Catherine Morshead. 

Filming for the second series began in 2008, and began airing on 20 April 2009 in the same timeslot. The second series takes place six months after the first, set in 1982 during the Falklands War. 
The episodes were shot on Super 16 film and mastered in 576p standard definition.

A third, and final, series was commissioned, and filming of the eight 60-minute episodes began in late 2009, premiering on 2 April 2010. This final series was shot in Super 16 again but telecined and mastered for high definition. In an interview with SFX, series co-creator and executive producer Matthew Graham stated that he was considering making a 3D episode. Once again, the series moved on a year, this time to 1983. Philip Glenister, speaking on the BBC One Breakfast TV programme on 8 June 2009, announced that the third series would be the last. Producers revealed the climax of the show would reveal who the character of Gene Hunt really is. The third series concluded on 21 May 2010.

The Audi Quattro was not available in right-hand drive in the United Kingdom in 1981, only in left-hand drive. The car shown in the TV series is the 1983 model, with slight changes to the headlights and other features.

International distribution
The programme premiered in America on 7 March 2009, available on both cable and satellite. The second series began broadcasting on BBC America on 11 May 2010 at 10:00 pm ET.

In Australia, Series 1 of Ashes to Ashes commenced on 10 August 2009 on ABC1, with the second series shown directly after. The third series commenced on 13 January 2011 on ABC1.

In Denmark, series 1 was shown for the first time on DR2 at 19.05 each weekday evening from 25 November 2011 under the title En hård nyser: Kommissær Hunt and is currently (May 2012) being repeated on the same channel.

In Portugal, the show is broadcast by Fox Life, while in Latin America, the series is shown on HBO Plus.

In Italy, Ashes to Ashes is broadcast by Rai 4.

In Europe, Ashes to Ashes is broadcast by BBC Entertainment.

Episode guide

The first series, set in 1981, consists of eight episodes, written mainly by creators Ashley Pharoah (episodes 2 & 8) and Matthew Graham (episodes 1 & 7). Other writers for the series were Julie Rutterford (episode three) and Mark Greig (episodes 4 & 5), who worked on the parent series, Life on Mars. The remaining episode (6) was written by freelance writer Mick Ford. In this series Alex tries to figure out what happened to her parents, whose lives are connected to the political unrest of the time, especially Margaret Thatcher's campaign and Lord Scarman's attacks on the police. Alex is haunted by a mysterious figure who seems to be the Clown from the music video of David Bowie's "Ashes to Ashes", reminiscent of the Test-Card Girl who bedevilled Sam Tyler in Life on Mars. (The clown's identity is revealed in the last episode of the first series.)

The second series of eight episodes is set in 1982, against the political background of the Falklands War. The first episode, written by Ashley Pharoah, deals with the cover-up of the killing of a police officer in a nightclub. As the series progresses, Alex's comatose body is found in present-day 2008. Gene finds himself confronting a corrupted force and Alex begins receiving a string of phone calls from a man called Martin Summers, another patient at the hospital to which she has been moved, and a key figure in the web of corruption Hunt is trying to bring down. Summers proves to be a formidable adversary, whose actions eventually lead to a murder and an extremely tense confrontation between Alex and Gene. The series ends with Alex awakening in what seems to be the present, but she is horrified to find Gene's face on monitors, pleading for help.

In the third and final series, set yet another year forward in 1983, DCI Gene Hunt, DI Alex Drake and the rest of the team all return, joined by a new addition, DCI Jim Keats, a discipline and complaints officer. Alex returns to the 1980s after being brought round by Gene, and she comes to believe the 2008 she woke up in was only a dream. Her connection to the present seems weaker than before, while Hunt is trying to stop his department crumbling from within due to Keats' presence. Although Jim is ostensibly friendly with Hunt's officers, he makes no effort to conceal his hatred of Gene when the two are alone, and attempts to turn Alex against him. Prompted by the haunting of a dead policeman and visions of stars, Alex becomes suspicious of the role Gene played in Sam Tyler's death following his return to the past, and, urged on by Jim, she eventually discovers the truth of Gene Hunt, her colleagues and the world she has been transported to.

In addition, the main cast appeared in short sketches for Children in Need 2008 (with Richard Hammond as himself) and Sport Relief 2010 (with Dickie Davies, Daley Thompson, Duncan Goodhew, Steve Cram, David Gower, Michael Parkinson, Sam Torrance, Tony Hadley, Paul Daniels and Debbie McGee as 1983 versions of themselves).

Soundtracks

The soundtrack features contemporary songs by British groups of the period such as punk period survivors The Clash and The Stranglers, New Romantics such as Duran Duran and Ultravox, synthpop such as Jon & Vangelis, OMD, later period Roxy Music and The Passions' sole hit single, "I'm in Love with a German Film Star", from 1981.  A scene in the second episode, "The Happy Day", set at The Blitz features Steve Strange playing himself performing "Fade to Grey" by Visage. The last episode in Series 1 ends with "Take the Long Way Home" from Supertramp's Breakfast in America 1979 album. Episode 2 also contains the classic Madness song "The Prince". The final episode of Series 3 plays out to David Bowie's "Heroes". Philip Glenister said that one of the reasons the series moved on to 1982 was due to running out of good songs and feared that they'd end up having to use Bucks Fizz's "The Land of Make Believe" (a brief snippet of the song is indeed used in the second series, as well as the same group's "Making Your Mind Up" being used in series one).

A CD soundtrack, Ashes to Ashes (Original Soundtrack), from the first series of the show was released on 17 March 2008. A CD soundtrack, Ashes to Ashes – Series 2 (Original Soundtrack), from the second series of the show was released on 20 April 2009. A CD soundtrack, Ashes to Ashes – Series 3 (Original Soundtrack), from the third series of the show was released on 12 April 2010.

During the second and third series, 1980s background music (some of which had been used during the show) was available to UK digital TV viewers by using the red button immediately after the show. Clips from Top of the Pops, The Old Grey Whistle Test and other 1980s BBC TV music programmes, introduced by Philip Glenister in his guise as DCI Gene Hunt, were looped for the remainder of the evening of transmission.

Track listings

Reception

Ratings
Based on overnight returns, The Guardian reported that audience figures for the 7 February 2008 broadcast of the first episode—in a 9 pm slot on the flagship channel, BBC One—were 7 million: about 29% of viewers. The figure was "in line with the final episode of Life on Mars in April last year, though well up on the earlier show's second series debut of 5.7 million two months earlier", but The Guardian noted "the heavy publicity blitz this week for Ashes to Ashes" as a factor in its success.

Critical reception
Critical reception to the first episode of the series was mixed, with positive reviews from  The Daily Telegraph, The Herald, The Spectator, and the New Statesman, and negative reviews from The Times, The Sunday Times, Newsnight Review, The Guardian, and The Observer, which criticised the episode's direction, structure, and tone (although it did praise the costumes and art direction). The national free sheet, Metro, gave the episode four stars as "a vote of faith" on what it described as "a dodgy start".

The Guardian reported on 15 February 2008 that, with 6.1 million viewers and a 25% audience share, the ratings for the second episode, shown on 14 February, were down by almost one million on the first, comparing overnight returns. It still did well against the Lynda La Plante police procedural Trial & Retribution, which fell to a series low on ITV. The fifth episode, broadcast 6 March 2008, attracted 6.6 million viewers according to overnight returns. With this episode, The Daily Telegraph stated that "Ashes to Ashes stepped out of the shadow of Life on Mars."

Addressing press complaints about the quality of Keeley Hawes' performance, Philip Glenister defended his co-star, stating, "It's a hellishly difficult thing to come into and I've seen how hard she works and how brilliant she is. To all those detractors, they're just plain wrong."

Entertainment news website Digital Spy praised the show's return, with cult editor Ben Rawson-Jones describing the opening episode of the second series as "greatly promising". It was watched by 7.01 million viewers.

The second series was nominated for The TV Dagger at the 2009 Crime Thriller Awards. Keeley Hawes and Philip Glenister received nominations in the Best Actress and Best Actor categories respectively.

The finale of Ashes To Ashes, which finished in 2010, has been described by Dean Andrews as "genius". He explained on GMTV: "Everything is tied up. You get all of the answers from Life on Mars and Ashes To Ashes."

When interviewed by SFX Magazine in May 2010, Matthew Graham spoke of teasing the BBC with a third set of series called The Laughing Gnome (the title suggests a prequel set in the 1960s), and claimed that they made "the whole title page and copyrighted it and everything". He said the BBC responded well to the joke, replying "Yeah, it's commissioned!".

The series three finale was watched by 6.45 million viewers.

Accolades

Cultural impact
In 2010, the Labour Party used an edited image of Gene Hunt on the Quattro with David Cameron's face as part of its general election campaign, with the words "Don't let him take Britain back to the 1980s". The slogan links the Conservative leader with memories of social unrest and youth unemployment. In response to this, the Conservatives posted a slightly modified version of the image with the words "Fire up the Quattro. It's time for Change. Vote for Change. Vote Conservative." Subsequently, Kudos Productions—which owns the copyright to the Gene Hunt character—wrote to both parties requiring them to cease using the image.

Philip Glenister was introduced to David Cameron, future UK Prime Minister, at the 2009 Police Bravery Awards. Glenister explained that Gene Hunt was popular with real police officers because he spent his time catching criminals rather than doing paperwork. He later quipped 'Six months later, he's (Cameron) on Radio 5 Live saying exactly what I've just said. Bastard nicked my line!"

DVD releases

References

External links

 
 Ashes to Ashes – Series 1, Episode 1 – Script
 

2000s British crime drama television series
2000s British mystery television series
2000s British police procedural television series
2000s British science fiction television series
2008 British television series debuts
2010 British television series endings
2010s British crime drama television series
2010s British mystery television series
2010s British police procedural television series
2010s British science fiction television series
British fantasy television series
British television spin-offs
British time travel television series
English-language television shows
Life on Mars (franchise)
Television series set in 1981
Television series set in 1982
Television series set in 1983
Television series set in 2008
Television shows set in London